Copperopolis is the third studio album by alternative rock band Grant Lee Buffalo. It was released in 1996 on Slash Records.

Production
The album was produced by bass player Paul Kimble. It was recorded in six weeks.
All songs were written by Grant Lee Phillips

Critical reception
No Depression wrote that "the sound is lush and more beautiful than ever." Trouser Press wrote that "every song is a miniature epic" and that "the record confirms Phillips as a pop auteur." The Rough Guide to Rock called the album "triumphant," writing that it introduced "a richer, more sweeping sound."

Track listing
All tracks composed by Grant Lee Phillips
"Homespun"
"The Bridge"
"Arousing Thunder"
"Even The Oxen"
"Crackdown"
"Armchair"
"Bethlehem Steel"
"All That I Have"
"Two & Two"
"Better For Us"
"Hyperion & Sunset"
"Comes To Blows"
"The Only Way Down"

References

Grant Lee Buffalo albums
1996 albums